The North and South Region Challenge Cups are regional senior non-league competitions run by the Scottish Football Association. The southern tournament is open to full member non-league clubs in the south of the country, while similar stipulations applied to its northern counterpart.

History 
The Challenge Cup competitions replaced the Scottish Qualifying Cup North and South competitions in 2007, after the SFA decided to allow full member clubs at non-league level direct entry to the Scottish Cup proper, and as a consequence the Qualifying Cups were scrapped. To compensate clubs for the demise of the tournaments, two new ones were put in their place.

North

The North competition was scrapped in 2009.

Finals

South

The South Challenge Cup features 163 senior non-league clubs from the Lowland Football League (16), East of Scotland Football League (59), South of Scotland Football League (10), and West of Scotland Football League (79). 

The reserve teams of Stirling University, Caledonian Braves, and Stranraer, as well as Celtic B, Hearts B and Rangers B, do not take part. It is an unseeded straight knock-out tournament, without replays. 

The competition is named the Traderadiators.com South Challenge Cup for sponsorship reasons.

Finals
 (aet) = Result after extra time.
 Bold = Winning team were also champions of their league

Performance by club

References

External links 

Football cup competitions in Scotland
2007 establishments in Scotland
Recurring sporting events established in 2007